The leader of the Five Star Movement is the de facto and/or de jure leader and guide of the M5S, a political party in Italy, founded in October 2009 by Beppe Grillo and Gianroberto Casaleggio.

List

Timeline

References

Five Star Movement politicians
Lists of leaders of political parties